Ricky MacMillan, (born 24 September 1961 in Surat, Queensland) is an Australian equestrian, international dressage judge, chair of Equestrian Australia and dentist.

She competed at the Sydney 2000 Olympics in the individual and the team dressage events. Riding Crisp, she finished in 35th place in the individual event, while the Australian team of Kristy Oatley, Mary Hanna, Rachael Downs and MacMillan finished 6th in the team event.

She subsequently competed at the Athens 2004 Olympics in the individual dressage event. Again riding Crisp, she finished 37th in the individual event.

Following her retirement from competition, MacMillan now acts as an international dressage judge.

In April 2019 MacMillan was appointed to the board of Equestrian Australia, and became chair of the board in November of the same year at the annual general meeting.

MacMillan is also a dentist and principal of a dental practice on the Gold Coast.

References 

Living people
1961 births
Australian female equestrians
Australian dressage riders
Equestrians at the 2000 Summer Olympics
Equestrians at the 2004 Summer Olympics
Olympic equestrians of Australia
Australian dentists